F is a modular, compiled, numeric programming language, designed for scientific programming and scientific computation. F was developed as a modern Fortran, thus making it a subset of Fortran 95. It combines both numerical and data abstraction features from these languages. F is also backwards compatible with Fortran 77, allowing calls to Fortran 77 programs. F was first included in the g95 compiler.

Overview 
F is designed to be a minimal subset of Fortran, with only about one hundred intrinsic procedures. Language keywords and intrinsic function names are reserved keywords in F and no other names may take this exact form. F contains the same character set used in Fortran 90/95 with a limit of 132 characters. Reserved words are always written in lowercase. Any uppercase letter may appear in a character constant. Variable names do not have restriction and can include upper and lowercase characters.

Operators
F supports many of the standard operators used in Fortran. The operators supported by F are: 
 Arithmetic operators: +, -, *, /, **
 Relational operators: <, <=, ==, /=, >, >= 
 Logical operators: .not., .and., .or., .eqv., .neqv. 
 character concatenation: //

The assignment operator is denoted by the equal sign =. In addition, pointer assignment is denoted by =>. Comments are denoted by the ! symbol:
variable = expression ! assignment 
pointer => target ! pointer assignment

Data types
Similar to Fortran, the type specification is made up of a type, a list of attributes for the declared variables, and the variable list. F provides all the same types as Fortran as well, with the sole exception of doubles:

! type [,attribute list] :: entity declaration list
real :: x, y ! declaring variables of type real x,y without an attribute list
integer (kind = long), dimension (100) :: x ! declaring variable of type big integer array with the identifier x
character (len = 100) :: student_name ! declaring a character type variable with len 100

F does not have intrinsic support for object-oriented programming, but it does allow for records:

type, public :: City
     character (len = 100) :: name
     character (len = 50) :: state
end type City

Variable declarations are followed by an attribute list. The attributes allowed are parameter, public, private, allocatable, dimension, intent, optional, pointer, save and target. The attribute list is followed by ::, which is part of the syntax. F also allows for optional initialization in the list of objects. All items in a list will have the same attributes in a given type declaration statement. In addition, declarations are attribute oriented instead of entity oriented.

Statement and control flow
F supports 3 statements for control flow: if, a basic conditional, case, a switch statement, and do, a conditional while loop. The return, stop, cycle, and exit statements from Fortran may be used to break control flow.

real :: x

do i = 100
   x += i
   print i
   cycle
end do

max : do
   if (x > y) then
      exit max:
   end if
   x = y;
end max
stop

if (x < y) then
     x = x + y;
else if ( x > y) then
     x = y - x;
end if

select case (maximum):
     case (0)
         x = 0
     case (1)
         x = 1
     case (5)
         x = 5
     case default 
         x = 10
end select

F places a heavy emphasis on modular programming. Modules in F are called "programs":

program main
    ! Insert code here
end program main

Placing procedures  outside of a module is prohibited. F supports most of the modules and subroutines found in the Fortran 95 standard library. All procedures in F are external by default, and require a result clause that returns the value of a function. F supports recursion.

All of the intrinsic procedures found in Fortran 95 may be used in F, with the exceptions of achar, iachar, lge, lgt, lle, llt, transfer, dble, dim, dprod, and mod.

References

External links 
 F Programming Language Homepage 
 g95 compiler 

Fortran programming language family
Programming languages